Honeymoon Deferred is a 1940 American mystery film directed by Lew Landers and written by Roy Chanslor and Eliot Gibbons. The film stars Edmund Lowe, Margaret Lindsay, Elisabeth Risdon, Chick Chandler, Joyce Compton, Cliff Clark and Anne Gwynne. The film was released on February 16, 1940, by Universal Pictures.

Plot
Detective Adam Farradene and his wife Janet Farradene have to postpone their honeymoon, because Adam has to investigate a murder. Janet gets really angry but wants to help out, despite Adam's insistence on working alone.

Cast        
Edmund Lowe as Adam Farradene
Margaret Lindsay as Janet Payne Farradene
Elisabeth Risdon as Sarah Frome
Chick Chandler as 'Hap' Maguire
Joyce Compton as Kitty Kerry
Cliff Clark as Police Insp. Mathews
Anne Gwynne as Cecile Blades
Julie Stevens as Eve Blades
Jerry Marlowe as Jimmy Blades
Joe Sawyer as Detective James
Lillian Yarbo as Janet's Maid

References

External links
 

1940 films
American mystery films
1940 mystery films
Universal Pictures films
Films directed by Lew Landers
American black-and-white films
1940s English-language films
1940s American films